Sir Hans Wolfgang Singer (1910–2006) was a German-born British development economist best known for the Singer–Prebisch thesis, which states that the terms of trade move against producers of primary products. He is one of the primary figures of heterodox economics.

Early life
He was born in Elberfeld, Germany (then the German Empire) on 29 November 1910. A German Jew, Singer had intended to become a medical doctor before he was inspired to study economics after attending a series of lectures by prominent economists Joseph Schumpeter and Arthur Spiethoff in Bonn. Singer fled the rise of Adolf Hitler in 1933, arriving in the United Kingdom as a refugee.

Career
In 1933, Schumpeter convinced John Maynard Keynes of Cambridge University to accept Singer as one of his first PhD candidates, and Singer received his doctorate in 1936.  His first academic post was in Manchester where he stayed from 1938 until 1944. Under Keynes, he produced two papers in 1937 and 1940 studying unemployment.  Keynes had also helped secure Singer's speedy release after his former student was interned by the British government at the start of the Second World War. In 1938, Singer applied for British citizenship, listing as references Keynes, William Beveridge, William Temple, and the vice-chancellor of Manchester University. His request was granted in 1946. 

In 1947, he was one of the first three economists to join the new Economics Department of the United Nations (UN), in which he remained for the next two decades. During his time at the United Nations, Singer was the Director of the Economic Division of the United Nations Industrial Development Organization (UNIDO), Director of the United Nations Research Institute for Social Development (UNRISD), and was closely involved in the creation of the Bretton Woods framework and the post–World War II international financial institutions.

He published a 1950 empirical study examining the costs of international trade, drawing criticism from fellow economists Jacob Viner and Gottfried Haberler. This led to his famous co-credit with Raul Prebisch for the Singer–Prebisch thesis. However, the two economists had not collaborated but had come to similar conclusions separately. Singer's supporters are quick to point out that it appears that Singer wrote down the thesis before the more well-known Prebisch. The fundamental claim of the hypothesis is that in a world system in which poorer nations specialise in primary products such as raw minerals and agricultural products that are then shipped to industrialised nations that, in turn, make advanced products to be sold to poorer nations, all of the benefits of international trade go to the wealthy nations.

As a result, Singer was a passionate advocate for increased foreign aid in a variety of forms to the developing world to offset the disproportionate gain to developed nations of trade. He attempted to create a "soft-loan" fund to offer loans at interest rates below market rates to be administered by the United Nations, but it was systematically blocked by the United States and the United Kingdom, which wished to retain control of money flowing out of the UN. He was thus considered "one of the wild men of the UN" by Eugene R. Black Sr. of the World Bank and American Senator Eugene McCarthy. His ideas were influential in the establishment of the bank's International Development Association, the United Nations Development Programme, and the World Food Programme.

Fellow economist Sir Alec Cairncross has said of Singer, "There are few of the developing countries that he has not visited and still fewer that he has not advised. He must have addressed a wider variety of academics and a wider variety of places about a wider variety of subjects than any other economist, living or dead." Singer, like Prebisch, was influential on neo-Marxist development theorists such as Paul Baran and Andre Gunder Frank. However, he was not normally considered a neo-Marxist himself and did not consider himself one.

Later life
In 1969, he left the UN to join the influential Institute of Development Studies (IDS) at the University of Sussex in England. He produced about 30 books under his name and nearly 300 other publications. The International Institute of Social Studies (ISS) awarded its honorary fellowship to Hans Singer in 1977. Singer was knighted by Queen Elizabeth II in 1994. In 2001 the UN World Food Programme awarded him the Food for Life award in recognition of his contribution to the battle against world hunger.  In November 2004, Singer was awarded the first Lifetime Achievement Award from the Development Studies Association. 

Singer died in Brighton on 26 February 2006.

Legacy
In commemoration and in honour of Sir Hans Singer the German Development Institute and the Institute of Development Studies initiated the Hans Singer Memorial Lecture on Global Development, which alternates between Bonn and Brighton on an annual basis. The first memorial lecture was given by the renowned development economist Paul Collier of the University of Oxford in May 2009 in Bonn. The second lecture was held in October 2010 in Brighton with Jomo Kwame Sundaram, Assistant Secretary General of the United Nations Economic Commission for Africa (UNECA). The third memorial lecture was given by Stephen Chan of the School of Oriental and African Studies at University of London in November 2011 at the German Development Institute in Bonn.

References

Footnotes

Bibliography

External links
 Hans Singer, EconomyProfessor.com
 Hans Singer archive at the British Library for Development Studies
 UN Chronicle biography
 Profile at The International Institute of Social Studies (ISS)
 Hans Singer’s Debts to Schumpeter and Keynes, John Toye, Cambridge Journal of Economics, 30, 6: 819–833.
 The origins and interpretation of the Prebisch-Singer thesis. John Toye and Richard Toye. History of Political Economy, 35, 3: 437–467

Obituaries
 The Guardian obituary by Richard Jolly
 The Times
 The Independent obituary by John Toye (subscription only)
 The Economist (subscription only)

1910 births
2006 deaths
20th-century  British economists
Academics of the University of Sussex
Alumni of King's College, Cambridge
British Jewish writers
Dependency theorists
British development economists
Jewish economists
Jewish emigrants from Nazi Germany to the United Kingdom
Knights Bachelor
Naturalised citizens of the United Kingdom
People from Elberfeld
People from the Rhine Province
University of Bonn alumni
Writers from Wuppertal